West Acton is a London Underground station between Ealing Broadway and North Acton on the Ealing Broadway branch of the Central line, and is its only intermediate station. The station is a Grade II listed building. It is located in West Acton in Travelcard Zone 3. The station is close to North Ealing tube station on the Piccadilly line, 550 metres away at the western end of Queens Drive.

History

As Transport for London explains:

The Great Western Railway (GWR) built the Ealing Broadway branch (the western part of the former Ealing & Shepherd's Bush Railway) and opened it for freight trains in April 1917, and the Central London Railway trains used the line from 3 August 1920.

GWR steam freight trains also ran through West Acton until 1938, when the London Underground tracks were segregated further east, through East Acton station, and to the west of North Acton station.

The current station, replacing the original building, was designed by the Great Western Railway, on behalf of London Transport, as part of the LPTB's 1935-40 New Works Programme improvements and extensions to the Central line. The design was by the GWR's architect Brian Lewis and it was completed by November 1940.

Connections
London Buses route 218 serves the station.

Gallery

References

Central line (London Underground) stations
London Underground Night Tube stations
Tube stations in the London Borough of Ealing
Former Great Western Railway stations
Railway stations in Great Britain opened in 1923
Grade II listed buildings in the London Borough of Ealing
Grade II listed railway stations
Acton, London